Guadalajara railway station (Spanish: Estación de Guadalajara) is a Spanish railway station owned by ADIF that serves the Spanish city of Guadalajara. There is another station outside the urban limits 5 km away from the city on the Madrid–Barcelona high-speed rail line called Guadalajara–Yebes railway station.

The Madrid–Guadalajara stretch was opened on 3 May 1859. Conversely, the Guadalajara–Jadraque stretch was opened on 5 October 1860.

References 

Railway stations in Castilla–La Mancha
Buildings and structures in Guadalajara, Spain
Cercanías Madrid stations
Railway stations in Spain opened in 1859